Amrit Pritam is a National Film Award winning sound designer and a member of the Academy of Motion Picture Arts and Sciences, popularly known as the Oscar, as well as the Motion Picture Sound Editors. He is the recipient along with Resul Pookutty of a Motion Picture Sound Editors Golden Reel Award and two Producers Guild of India – Apsara Awards  Additionally, Pritam has been conferred with awards by the state governments of Assam, Goa, and Maharashtra.

He has served on several notable film juries, including the House of Illusions jury at the Chalachitram National Film Festival, the Assam State Film Awards, and the Goa State Film Awards.

Early life
Amrit Pritam was born on 4 November 1975, in Jorhat town, Assam. He graduated in Physics from JB College, Jorhat, in 1998. And then did a 3-year Sound Engineering course at the Dr. Bhupen Hazarika Regional Government Film and Television Institute, Guwahati, Assam. Following his education, he moved to Mumbai in 2002 and started working in films, initially, as a FX foley tracklayer, dialogue cleaner, pre-mixer, production mixer, and sound editor.

Film studies 
Amrit Pritam has served on the Academic council of the film Studies dept. of JB College, Jorhat, Assam; and has conducted film workshops and classes at film festivals such as SIFFCY and educational venues such as Guwahati University, Cotton University, Tezpur University, and the Film and Television Institute of India. He plans to someday set up a school dedicated to teaching the art of sound in cinema.

Filmography
Amrit Pritam has in the last two decades worked in the sound department of over 140 films in a variety of languages — Hindi, English, Assamese, Malayalam, Tamil, Marathi, Telugu, Kannada, Gujarati, Khasi, Bodo, Dimasa and Tiwa (Lalung). Quite a few of them have won National Film Awards as well as awards in international film festivals, in a variety of categories. Many others went to be super box-office hits.

A notable voice originally from Assam but who has never limited himself to any single, particular region, Pritam worked closely with Resul Pookutty in the Oscar-winning Slumdog Millionaire directed by Danny Boyle. Other notable films from all over the country as well as overseas include 2.0, Kaabil, Village Rockstars, Bioscopewala, Kick, Highway, Jazba, Roar, Ra.One, Endhiran — The Robot, Liv & Ingmar, Chittagong, Ghajini, Blue, Nanban, English Vinglish, Margarita with a Straw, Aakhon Dekhi, A Rainy Day, Kerala Varma Pazhassi Raja, Omkara, Black, Maqbool, Mangal Pandey, India's Daughter, PK, and Court.

Awards

References

External links 
Amrit Pritam at House of Illusions

1975 births
Living people
Indian sound designers
Assamese people
People from Jorhat district
Indian sound editors
National Film Award (India) winners